Tupig, also known as intemtem or kangkanen, is a Filipino rice cake originating from northwestern Luzon, particularly the regions of Pangasinan, Tarlac, and Ilocos. It is made from ground slightly-fermented soaked glutinous rice (galapong) mixed with coconut milk, muscovado sugar, and young coconut (buko) strips. It is wrapped into a cylindrical form in banana leaves and baked directly on charcoal, with frequent turning. The name tupig means "flattened", in reference to its shape after cooking. It is popularly sold as street food in Pangasinan, particularly during the Christmas season. It is typically eaten with ginger tea (salabat).

A notable variant of tupig is tinubong, which uses the same ingredients but is cooked in bamboo tubes buried with embers.

See also
 Bibingka
 Panyalam
 Suman
 Puto bumbong

References

External links

Philippine rice dishes
Foods containing coconut
Philippine desserts
Glutinous rice dishes
Christmas food